The Bismarck fantail (Rhipidura dahli) is a fantail native to the islands New Britain and New Ireland. The binomial commemorates the German naturalist Friedrich Dahl.

Taxonomy 
According to IOC there are 2  recognised subspecies. In alphabetical order, these are:

 R. d. antonii Hartert, E, 1926
 R. d. dahli Reichenow, 1897

References

Bismarck fantail
Birds of the Bismarck Archipelago
Bismarck fantail